Lotus Lantern (Chinese: 宝莲灯; pinyin: Băo Lián Dēng) is a 2005 Chinese television drama based on the Chinese fairy tale The Magic Lotus Lantern (劈山救母; Pī Shān Jiù Mǔ). The 35-episode series was premiered on CCTV-8 starting on October 4, 2005. A prequel, Prequel to the Lotus Lantern, was broadcast in 2009.

Cast 
 Jian Ding as "Monkey King" Sun Wukong
 Jiang Wen as Chenxiang
 Park Si-yeon as Yang Chan
 Ning Xie as Pigsy
 Si Yang as Jade-Faced Fox
 Zhang Zhichao as Nezha

External links 

2005 Chinese television series debuts
Mandarin-language television shows
Shenmo television series